The College of Law and Business is a private college in Ramat Gan, Israel. It was established in 1995 by members of the law faculty of Hebrew University of Jerusalem. The president is Yoram Balsher.

Program for English speakers 
In 2013, it became the first Israeli academic institution to offer an undergraduate law degree (LL.B.) that is taught some in English. The Council of Higher Education of Israel (CHEI) mandates that the law of the land has to be taught in the language of the land.
In October 2017, the College of Law and Business will open a business degree track that is taught in English. The college also offer a dual track option where students can study in fours years both an LL.B. and a BA in business.

Social impact of CLB legal clinics 
The faculty of law runs six legal clinics, including immigration law, environmental law which was instrumental in the petition filed with the Supreme Court regarding the natural gas resources in Israel, prisoner rights clinic which stopped the privatization of the prisons in Israel and recently petitioned the Israeli high courts to increase the living space for prisoners and the government oversight clinic, which filed a petition to stop the government's move to a bi-annual budget instead of an annual budget.

According to the 2016 Israeli Bar Association exam results, The College of Law and Business submitted the second-largest number of students to the Israeli bar exam.

International academic relations 
The College has academic ties with academic institions around the world. Each summer CLB students are given the opportunity to attend internships, seminars and workshops at Harvard university, Oxford University, Kassel University, Paris's ICC, and others.
In February 2017, two of the English speaking students won the international moot mediation competition at the International Chamber of Commerce.

See also
Education in Israel
Economy of Israel

References 

Schools in Israel
1995 establishments in Israel